Vila Verde da Raia is a civil parish in the municipality of Chaves, Portugal. It is one of the main crossings on the Portugal–Spain border.

References

Freguesias of Chaves, Portugal
Portugal–Spain border crossings